Sayyid Jawad Kadhim Nasrallah (died January 2, 1808) was an Iraqi nobleman that served as the 21st custodian of the Imam Husayn shrine from 1802 until 1808.

Biography 
Nasrallah was born c. 1725 to Kadhim Nasrallah. His grandfather Nasrallah al-Faizi, is the patriarch of the Nasrallah family, and a prominent scholar and poet. He hails from the noble Al Faiz family.

Due to his position, Nasrallah was sometimes known as Jawad al-Killidar, which roots from the Persian words, kileet and dar, which translates to key holder. This was a name often given to those that take on the role of tending to holy shrines. However, Nasrallahs descendants did not carry the name, and remained with Nasrallah.

With the help of the son of Sayyid Muhammad Mehdi al-Shahristani (d. 1801), he combined the mosque that headquartered the Sunni mufti of Karbala with the grand courtyard, forcing the garrison of Karbala, Amin Agha Turk, to relocate the mufti to the small courtyard also known as the Buyid graveyard.

In 1804, he supervised the expansion of the precinct of the grave, adding Ibrahim al-Mujab's grave and rawaq (hallway) to the north west side of the precinct.

Death 
Nasrallah died on Saturday, January 2, 1808, and was buried in the Al Nasrallah graveyard in the Imam Husayn shrine.

See also 

 Imam Husayn shrine
 Al Faiz family

References 

People from Karbala
1802 deaths
Custodian of the Imam Husayn Shrine
18th-century Arabs
19th-century Arabs